Ust-Mosikha is a rural locality (a selo) and the administrative center of Ust-Mosikhinsky Selsoviet, Rebrikhinsky District, Altai Krai, Russia. The population was 1,075 in 2016. There are 15 streets.

Geography 
Ust-Mosikha is located 31 km northwest of Rebrikha (the district's administrative centre) by road. Makarovo is the nearest rural locality.

References 

Rural localities in Rebrikhinsky District